Country Airs is a studio album by English keyboardist Rick Wakeman. It was released in 1986 by Coda Records, and features piano instrumentals inspired by the countryside. The album marked a stylistic shift in Wakeman's output, having established himself primarily with progressive rock, concept albums, and commercial-oriented music at the start of the 1980s.

The album reached number one on the UK New Age chart. It was followed by two sequels, Sea Airs and Night Airs, released in 1989 and 1990, respectively for President Records. A re-recording with four new compositions was released in 1992, also published by President. Wakeman later revealed that he regretted this version, doing it only because Coda had gone bankrupt, and refused to sell him the rights to the original. The 1992 edition features Wakeman playing a digital piano, rather than an acoustic one.

Track listing

Original LP
Side one
"Dandelion Dreams" – 4:13
"Stepping Stones" – 3:49
"Ducks and Drakes" – 3:57
"Morning Haze" – 3:05
"Waterfalls" – 3:59

Side two
"Quiet Valleys" – 4:24
"Nature Trails" –  3:23
"Heather Carpets" – 4:01
"Lakeland Walks" – 3:58
"Wild Moors" – 3:24

1992 CD

"Lakeland Walks" – 3:50
"Wild Moors" – 3:59
"Harvest Festival" – 3:12
"The Glade" – 2:53
"Dandelion Dreams" – 5:35
"Ducks and Drakes" – 3:58
"Green to Gold" – 3:19
"Stepping Stones" – 5:10
"Morning Haze" – 4:03
"Waterfalls" – 5:33
"The Spring" – 3:47
"Quiet Valleys" – 6:00
"Nature Trails" – 4:07
"Heather Carpets" – 3:44

Personnel
Rick Wakeman – grand piano, production

References 

1986 albums
Rick Wakeman albums